San Agustín Acasaguastlán is a town, with a population of 17,728 (2018 census), and a municipality in the El Progreso department of Guatemala.

References 

Municipalities of the El Progreso Department